Ati is an unclassified Loloish language of Huaning County, Yunnan, China.

Classification
Pelkey (2011:431) suggests that the Xiqi, Ati, and Long languages of Huaning County may be Southeastern Loloish languages. Hsiu (2018) also suggests a Southeastern Loloish affiliation.

Distribution
The Huaning County Gazetteer 华宁县志 (1994:514) lists the following locations of Ati.
Huaxi Township 华溪乡: Xiaozhai 小寨, Daxinzhai 大新寨, Heiniubai 黑牛白
Chengjiao Township 城郊乡: Faguo 法果, Mada 吗哒, Zanle 咱乐, Chongmai 冲麦
Xincheng Township 新城乡: Longmu 龙亩, Tulaoyi 土老依, Naguo 那果
Tonghongdian Township 通红甸乡: Zele 则勒, Momian 磨面, Xiaoguodi 小锅底
Qinglong Township 青龙镇: Zhongcun 中村, Yifu 矣甫, Daomakan 倒马坎
Lufeng Township 禄丰乡: Chekaibi 扯开比

Vocabulary
The Huaning County Ethnic Gazetteer (1992:72) provides a short word list of Adu, Ati, Xiqi, Nong, and Azhe transcribed using Chinese characters, shown below. Pinyin transliterations have also been provided below.

References

Loloish languages
Languages of China